Dave Malkoff (born March 1, 1976) is an American television journalist working for The Weather Channel. He has covered some of the most destructive hurricanes in US history. Dave has hosted more than a dozen documentaries that air on the network under the title "The Weather Channel Explores". He reported from Iraq at the end of Operation Iraqi Freedom in 2010. Dave produced an Emmy Award winning documentary about the war in Iraq.

Career
Malkoff is the Chief Environmental Correspondent for The Weather Channel. He reports major weather events, science & technology. He frequently contributes to The Today Show, MSNBC, CNBC, CNBC Europe & NBC television stations nationwide. 
Dave formerly reported for KTLA in Los Angeles, California. His daily "Malkoff on a Mission" segments at 10PM were feature reports with a tech edge. In April 2007, Dave joined KCBS-TV and KCAL-TV, the CBS west coast owned stations based in Los Angeles. His extended feature story reports would often appear as the "6:15 Spotlight" segment on KCBS's weekday-evening newscast.

His focus is science, technology and features along with general assignment and news reporting. His reporting career began at WICD-TV in Champaign, Illinois. Dave has been a reporter in Las Vegas, Miami & San Francisco. Early in his career, he was an associate producer in Columbus, Ohio.

Personal life
Dave Malkoff was born in Youngstown, Ohio where he got his start in broadcasting by running a low-power radio station in his Liberty Twp. basement.

He also built and ran the television station for Liberty High School before moving onto commercial radio and television. This was all before he started college at The Ohio State University.

Malkoff is married with a son and a daughter.

Emmy Awards and nominations
 2018 News & Documentary Emmy Nomination : Outstanding Coverage of a Breaking News Story in a Newscast
2013 Los Angeles Regional Emmy Nomination : Light News Story - Single Report 
 2013 Los Angeles Regional Emmy Nomination : Outstanding News Feature Reporting
 2012 Los Angeles Regional Emmy Award : Outstanding News Feature Reporting
 2012 Los Angeles Regional Emmy Award : Medical News Story - Multi-Part Report
 2012 Los Angeles Regional Emmy Nomination : Light News Story - Single Report 
 2011 Los Angeles Regional Emmy Award : News Special 
 2011 Los Angeles Regional Emmy Nomination : Light News Story - Single Report
 2010 Los Angeles Regional Emmy Nomination : Serious News Story - Single Report 
 2010 Los Angeles Regional Emmy Nomination : Outstanding News Feature Reporting
 2009 Los Angeles Regional Emmy Nomination : Outstanding News Feature Reporting 
 2008 Los Angeles Regional Emmy Nomination : Light News Story 
 2006 Suncoast Regional Emmy Nomination : Spot News 
 2006 Suncoast Regional Emmy Nomination : Reporter Features/Human Interest 
 2005 Suncoast Regional Emmy Award : Feature Segment 
 2004 Pacific Southwest Regional Emmy Award : News Feature (Same Day)
 2004 Suncoast Regional Emmy Nomination : Spot News
 2004 Suncoast Regional Emmy Nomination : Reporting
 2001 Pacific Southwest Regional Emmy Nomination : Documentary
 1998 Ohio Valley Regional Emmy Nomination : Newscast
 1998 Ohio Valley Regional Emmy Award : Team Effort on News Event Coverage

References

External links
 DaveMalkoff.com Official Website
 YouTube: Dave Malkoff's Iraq War Documentary
 KTLA Biography
 KTLA Blog
 

1976 births
Living people
American television journalists
Regional Emmy Award winners
People from Youngstown, Ohio
American reporters and correspondents
The Weather Channel people
American male journalists
Journalists from Ohio